John Cassels may refer to:
 J. W. S. Cassels (John William Scott Cassels), British mathematician
 John F. Cassels, member of the Mississippi House of Representatives
 Sir John Cassels (civil servant), English civil servant and educationalist